Liu Dagang (February 8, 1904 – September 14, 1991) was a Chinese chemist, who was a member of the Chinese Academy of Sciences.

References 

1904 births
1991 deaths
Members of the Chinese Academy of Sciences